was a town located in Kimotsuki District, Kagoshima Prefecture, Japan.

As of December 1, 2005, the town had an estimated population of 7,542 and the density of 127.5 persons per km². The total area was 59.15 km².

On January 1, 2006, Aira, along with the town of Kushira (also from Kimotsuki District), and the town of Kihoku (from Soo District), was merged into the expanded city of Kanoya and no longer exists as an independent municipality.

External links
 Official website of Kanoya 

Dissolved municipalities of Kagoshima Prefecture